El Pibe Cabeza is a 1975 Argentine crime drama film directed by Leopoldo Torre Nilsson.

Cast
 Alfredo Alcón - Roberto Gordillo, El Pibe Cabeza
 Marta González - Julieta Dunne
 José Slavin - Caprioli
 Edgardo Suárez - el Nene Martínez
 Raúl Lavié - el Negro Mota
 Emilio Alfaro - Romano
 Silvia Montanari - El Pibe Cabeza's lover
 Ana Casares - Lucía

External links
 

1975 films
1970s Spanish-language films
1975 crime drama films
Films set in the Infamous Decade
Films directed by Leopoldo Torre Nilsson
Argentine crime drama films
1970s Argentine films